

Anne Brontë poems

A Reminiscence
Home
Lines Composed in a Wood on a Windy Day
Memory
Music On Christmas Morning
Past Days
The Arbour
The Consolation
The Doubter's Prayer
The Penitent
To Cowper
Vanitas Vanitatum Omnia Vanitas

Branwell Brontë poems

Lines
On Caroline
Thorp Green
Remember Me

Charlotte Brontë poems

Apostacy
Early wrapt in slumber deep
Evening Solace
Frances
Life
Mementos
On the Death Of Anne Bronte
Parting
Passion
Pilate's Wife's Dream
Preference
Presentiment
Regret
Speak Of The North! A Lonely Moor
The Letter
The Missionary
The Teacher's Monologue
The Wife's Will
The Wood
Winter Stores

Emily Brontë poems

A Death-Scene
A Little While
Come hither child
Remembrance
Day Dream
F. De Samara to A. G. A.
Hope (ballad) 
How Clear She Shines
Heavy hangs the raindrop
Lines
Lines (Far away is the land of rest)
My Comforter
My Lady's Grave
Death
No Coward Soul is Mine
The Old Stoic
Self Interrogation
Song for A.A
Song (1839)
Song (1846)
Spellbound
Stanza
To a Wreath of Snow
To Imagination
The Prisoner

 
Bronte